Circus Smirkus is a non-profit, award-winning, international youth circus founded in 1987 by Rob Mermin. Based in Greensboro, Vermont, the mission of Circus Smirkus is to promote the skills, culture and traditions of the traveling circus and to inspire youth to engage in the circus arts.

History
From 1990 to 2010, the circus has had more than 4,000 youths aged 10–18 in its summer camps.

This annual camp was located at Sterling College in Craftsbury, Vermont through 2009. The camp relocated onto the campus of Lyndon Institute in Lyndon, Vermont in 2010.

As of 2015, the camp moved to the Smirkus HQ, Greensboro, VT. A new campus was built 2014-2015.

Big Top Tour

Smirkus' performers and coaches have come from Canada, China, Colombia, United Kingdom, Ethiopia, France, Georgia, Germany, Hungary, Indonesia, Israel, Italy, Kazakhstan, Latvia, Moldova, Mongolia, the Netherlands, New Zealand, Russia, Sweden, Thailand, Ukraine, Zambia, ten Native American nations and 20 US states. At the International Children's Festival at Wolf Trap National Park for the Performing Arts in September 2000, Circus Smirkus was introduced as "the United Nations of the youth circus world."

Summer camp 
Circus Smirkus has a summer camp that trains children in areas such as aerials, clowning/performance, acrobatics and juggling. Participants may also choose to train in other skills such as human pyramids, unicycling and stilt walking. The camp sessions offered throughout the season vary from one night overnight camps, one and two-week camps, and advanced camps, including  Road Show, Intermediate Skills Intensive, Advanced Individual Acts, and Advanced Ensemble. Smirkus Camp also offers an all ages camp for Friends and Family at the end of the summer season.

Awards and honors
 1992: Vermont Arts Council's Award of Excellence
 1994: Dove Foundation Award for Family Values
 1994: Named "one of America's best circuses" by Family Fun Magazine
 1997: The Bessie Award from Burlington City Arts
 1998: People's Choice Award at "Circus Youth of Today" Festival in Sweden
 2000: Dubbed "the United Nations of the youth circus world" by Wolf Trap Foundation for the Performing Arts
 2004: Smirkus founder Rob Mermin awarded the Lund Family Center's "It Takes a Village" Award
 2004: Smirkus founder Rob Mermin awarded Vermont Arts Council's Citation of Merit "for distinguished service to the arts in Vermont"
 2008: Smirkus founder Rob Mermin awarded the Vermont Governor's Award for Excellence in the Arts

Collaborations

Notable alumni

Jade Kindar-Martin, highwire walker. Holds Guinness World Record for double skywalk across the River Thames in London.
Taylor Wright-Sanson, unicyclist, equilibrist. 2008 Winner of Canada's national unicycle competition, the Ottawa Unicycle Invasion.
Molly Saudek, tightwire dancer. Silver Medalist at the 1998 Festival Mondial Du Cirque De Demain in Paris.
Jacob and Nathaniel Sharpe, diaboloists. Performed at 2007 Festival Mondial Du Cirque De Demain in Paris.
John Stork. Finalist on Who Wants to Be a Superhero?
Dan Brown. Stunt performer for Pirates of the Caribbean: At World's End, Letters from Iwo Jima, and others.
Ariana Wunderle, tightwire walker. 2022 Guinnes World Record for farthest distance walked on a wire in high heels.

Footnotes

External links
Circus Smirkus website
Watch Circus Smirkus on YouTube
Circus Dreams - a documentary featuring Circus Smirkus

Circuses
Vermont culture
Circus schools
Greensboro, Vermont
Education in Orleans County, Vermont